Borough Hall may refer to:

Brooklyn Borough Hall, New York
Bronx Borough Hall, New York
Queens Borough Hall, New York
Staten Island Borough Hall, New York
Borough Hall of the Borough of Waynesboro, Pennsylvania
Edgewater Borough Hall, New Jersey
Metuchen Borough Hall, New Jersey
Borough Hall, Haddonfield, New Jersey
Borough Hall, Bedford, England

See also
Court Street – Borough Hall (New York City Subway), station serving Brooklyn Borough Hall
Seat of local government